Hajjiabad (also Romanized as Ḩajjīābād, Ḩajīābād, and Ḩājjīābād) is a village in Khorram Dasht Rural District, Kamareh District, Khomeyn County, Markazi Province, Iran. At the 2006 census, its population was 56, in 14 families.

References 

Populated places in Khomeyn County